Chandrashekar Nataraj ,  an American-Indian scientist, holds the  Mr. and Mrs. Robert F. Moritz, Sr. Endowed Chair in Engineered Systems in the Mechanical Engineering Department at Villanova University:.

Biography
C. Nataraj attended Indian Institute of Technology from 1977 to 1982 where he received the Bachelor of Science in Mechanical Engineering degree. After graduating he moved to Arizona State University where he received his M.Sc degree in Mechanical Engineering  in 1984 for his research on “The Simulation of Cracked Shaft Dynamics”. He then received his PhD degree in Engineering Science in 1987 for his research on “Periodic Solution in Nonlinear Mechanical Systems”,  supervised by Professor Harold D. Nelson at Arizona State University

Academic work
He  has worked on research problems  in nonlinear dynamic systems with applications to machinery diagnostics, rotor dynamics, vibration, control, electromagnetic bearings, mobile robotics, unmanned vehicles and biomedical diagnostics.

Research
Nataraj has founded and established 2 major research centers in the college of engineering at Villanova University. He served as founding director of interdisciplinary research center called Center for Nonlinear Dynamics and Control (CENDAC)  which was founded in 2003.

Other professional activities
Research Engineer and Vice President, Trumpler Associates, Inc., West Chester, PA.

Honors 
Elected Fellow of American Society of Mechanical Engineers
Elected member of the Franklin Institute's Committee of the Sciences and the Arts
Chairman of the Board of Directors of the Turbo Research Foundation
Serves on  ASME's Technical Committee on Vibration & Sound, the IFToMM Committee,
North American Editor for the journal Advances in Vibration Engineering

References

Arizona State University alumni
Villanova University faculty
Indian mechanical engineers
Living people
Year of birth missing (living people)